Sunstorm is the self-titled album by the AOR side project of former Rainbow vocalist Joe Lynn Turner.

Track listing
 "Keep Tonight" - 4:03 (Joe Lynn Turner, Jack Ponti)
 "Fame and Fortune" - 4:01 (Turner, Laurence Alan Dvoskin)
 "Heart over Mind" - 4:13 (Van Stephenson, Dave Robbins)
 "This Is My Heart" - 3:56 (Jim Peterik)
 "Strength Over Time" - 4:31 (Peterik)
 "Another You" - 4:56 (Peterik, Dick Eastman)
 "Fist Full of Heat" - 4:37 (G. Green, Dann Huff, Stephenson)
 "Love's Gone Wrong" - 3:52 (Turner, Dvoskin)
 "Night Moves" - 5:07 (John Astley, Marilyn Martin)
 "Danger of Love" - 5:07 (Peterik)
 "Making Up for Lost Time" - 4:21 (Peterik, Bill Syniar, Bill Unger)
 "Arms of Love" - 4:09 (Peterik, David Carl)
 "Another You (Remix)" - 4:57 (Peterik, Dick Eastman)  {Japanese edition bonus track}

Personnel
Sunstorm
Joe Lynn Turner - lead vocals
Dennis Ward - bass, backing vocals, additional guitars, keyboards
Uwe Reitenauer - rhythm and lead guitar
Chris Schmidt - drums
Jochen Weyer - keyboards

Production
Dennis Ward - producer, engineer, mixing
Serafino Perugino - executive producer

References

External links
Joe Lynn Turner official website
Dennis Ward official website
Metal Temple
allmusic.com

2006 albums
Sunstorm (band) albums
Frontiers Records albums
Albums produced by Dennis Ward (musician)